Stournara 288 (Στουρνάρα 288) (filmed in 1959) was a drama by Dinos Dimopoulos with Orestis Makris, Smaroula Giouli, Sofia Vembo, Dionysis Papagiannopoulos, Dinos Iliopoulos.  It was bitter and nostalgic eyes on its alienation on Athens' neighbourhoods.

Cast
Sofia Vembo ..... Mrs. Evgenia / Jenny Blanche / Sofia Vembo
Dinos Iliopoulos ..... Platon
Orestis Makris ..... Babis
Smaroula Giouli ..... Doudou Vraila
Dionysis Papagiannopoulos ..... Agisilaos Papafronimopoulos
Giorgos Gavriilidis ..... Thomas Asimomytis
Marika Krevata ..... Kleio Asimomyti
Beata Asimakopoulou ..... Foula Papafronimopoulou
Apostolos Avdis ..... Kalohairetas
Dimitris Kallivokas ..... Antoine Kokos
Dina Trianti ..... Fofo Asimomyti
Mary Chronopoulou ..... Mary
Nikos Fermas ..... Karasolinas

References

External links

1959 films
1959 drama films
Films directed by Dinos Dimopoulos
Greek drama films
1950s Greek-language films